Dolmen is a French TV miniseries consisting of six 90 minute-long episodes, and starring Ingrid Chauvin. It was written by Nicole Jamet and Marie-Anne Le Pezennec, and broadcast for the first time between 13 June and 18 July 2005 on TF1.

Synopsis
The story is set in Ty Kern, an island off the coast of Brittany (which is, in real life, Belle-Île-en-Mer). In Ty Kern, four families are connected by ancient rivalries and secrets: the Kersaints, the Le Bihans, the Pérecs, and the Kermeurs. Marie Kermeur, a young police lieutenant, returns to the island to marry her childhood love, Christian Bréhat. But on the day before their wedding, strange events begin to happen. The bloody corpse of a seagull is brought in by the tide, Marie is assaulted by strange nightmares during the night, her brother Gildas is found dead, and menhirs near the town begin to ooze blood.

Aided by an inspector from the mainland, Lucas Fersen, Marie decides to clarify these strange phenomena. It is now that a series of deaths begin.

Cast and characters

Family tree

Kermeur family
Proprietors of a hotel.
 Marie, lieutenant of the Gendarmerie in Brest (Ingrid Chauvin)
 Millic, Marie's father (later known not to be so) (Jean-Louis Foulquier)
 Jeanne, Marie's mother (later known not to be so) (Martine Sarcey)
 Gildas, Marie's other brother (Luc Thuiller)
 Loïc, Marie's brother (Manuel Gélin)
 Nicolas, Loïc's son (Tom Hygreck)

Pérec family
 Yves, medical doctor and mayor (Marc Rioufol)
 Chantal, Yves' wife (Catherine Wilkening)
 Aude, daughter of Yves and Chantal (Lizzie Brocheré)

Kersaint family
 Arthus, Châtelain (Georges Wilson)
 Pierre-Marie ("PM"), Arthus' son (Hippolyte Girardot)
 Erwan de Kersaint, Arthus' son and Marie's real father (both secrets later to be revealed) (Yves Rénier)
 Armelle, Pierre-Marie's wife (Laure Killing)
 Juliette, daughter of Pierre-Marie and Armelle (Emilie de Preissac)

Le Bihan family
Owners of a faïencerie (factory for fancy pottery)
 Yvonne, head of the business (Nicole Croisille)
 Pierric, Yvonne's mentally handicapped son (Chick Ortega)
 Gwenaëlle (often shortened to Gwen), Yvonne's daughter (Micky Sébastian)
 Philippe, Gwenaëlle's husband (Didier Bienaimé)
 Ronan, son of Gwenaëlle and Philippe (Thomas de Sambi)

Other characters
 Christian Bréhat, Marie Kermeur's fiancé, a famous Yacht racing captain (Xavier Deluc)
 Anne Bréhat, Christian's sister, owner of a café at Ty Kern (Brigitte Froment)
 Lucas Fersen, major in the Brest Gendarmerie (Bruno Madinier)
 Patrick Ryan (false identity adopted by Erwan de Kersaint), Irish novelist
 Stéphane Morineau, head of computer forensics for the Brest Gendarmerie (Richard Valls)

Technical details
 Directed by: Didier Albert
 Screenplay: Marianne Le Pezennec and Nicole Jamet
 Production: TF1 and Marathon Productions

Filming locations
 Port of Ty Kern: port of Sauzon, Belle-Île-en-Mer.
 Faïencerie Le Bihan: the faïencerie HB-Henriot, Quimper.
 The lighthouse: the lighthouse of the Kermorvan peninsula, at Le Conquet.
 Site de Guénoc (English: Guénoc place—the bleeding menhirs): built with concrete on a metallic structure on the Kermorvan peninsula, near the lighthouse at Le Conquet.
 Château des Kersaint (the castle of the Kersaint family): Château de Kerouartz, in Lannilis. It is an early 17th-century mansion, where a woman was, in fact, murdered.

International broadcast
 Basque Country: ETB2, October 2006 — November 2006
 Belgium: RTL TVI, June 2005 – July 2005
 Germany: RTL 2, November 2006
 Hungary: RTL Klub, 2006 summer
 Italy: Rete 4, August 2006 – September 2006
 Portugal: RTP1, August 2006
 Switzerland: TSR, June 2005 – July 2005
 Poland: TVP 1, February 2006
 Russia: TV3, May 2007
 Finland: MTV3, June 2007 — August 2007
 Slovenia: POP TV, July 2007 — August 2007
 Portugal: RTP1, December 2007
 Czech Republic: TV Nova, January 2008
 Catalunya: TV3, January 2008
 Netherlands: Misdaatnet (Dutch commercial crime TV network), May 2011
 United States: MHz WorldView, September 2013

Accolades

References

External links

2000s French drama television series
Television shows set in France
2005 French television series debuts
2005 French television series endings
TF1 original programming